

84001–84100 

|-id=011
| 84011 Jean-Claude ||  || Jean-Claude Pelle (born 1942), a French amateur astronomer and discoverer of minor planets || 
|-id=012
| 84012 Deluise || 2002 PR || Fiore De Luise (born 1977), an Italian astronomer and discoverer of minor planets at the University of Rome who has collaborated with the CINEOS program || 
|-id=015
| 84015 Efthymiopoulos ||  || Christos Efthymiopoulos (born 1971) is Research Director at the Research Center for Astronomy of the Academy of Athens, and teaches Dynamical Astronomy at the Physics Department of the University of Athens. || 
|-id=075
| 84075 Peterpatricia ||  || Peter M. Lowe (born 1933) and Patricia Lowe (born 1935), parents of the Canadian amateur astronomer Andrew Lowe who discovered this minor planet || 
|-id=095
| 84095 Davidjohn ||  || David John Matson (born 1937), father of American astronomer Robert Matson who discovered this minor planet || 
|-id=096
| 84096 Reginaldglenice ||  || Reginald J. Harding (born 1932) and Glenice E. Harding (born 1931), parents-in-law of the discoverer Andrew Lowe || 
|-id=100
| 84100 Farnocchia ||  || Davide Farnocchia (born 1984), a mathematician and celestial mechanic at the University of Pisa || 
|}

84101–84200 

|-id=118
| 84118 Bracalicioci ||  || Davide Bracali Cioci (born 1986), a celestial mechanician who graduated from the University of Pisa. || 
|-id=119
| 84119 Sanitariitaliani ||  || All doctors, nurses and everyone else in the Italian healthcare system (Sanitari Italiani) who played an essential role in the COVID-19 pandemic in Italy || 
|-id=120
| 84120 Antonacci ||  || Domenico Antonacci (born 1969), who has been involved in astronomy outreach for several years. He has been a pioneer for disabled people, in particular the blind. He founded the Associazione Cascinese Astrofili, and has been one of the founders and communicators at the astronomical observatory of Libbiano (PI), Italy. || 
|-id=200
| 84200 Robertmoore ||  || Robert Moore (born 1923), American space engineer who worked on the Mercury program, Titan missiles, Fleetsatcom and the Tracking and Data Relay Satellite System || 
|}

84201–84300 

|-id=224
| 84224 Kyte ||  || Frank Kyte (born 1949), American geochemist and meteoriticist who studies the component of distal impact deposits of meteorites || 
|-id=225
| 84225 Verish ||  || Robert S. Verish (born 1947), an American meteor observer and meteorite hunter. He has found over 100 meteorites in California, Nevada and Arizona, including the "Los Angeles" Shergottite – the fourteenth recognized meteorite from Mars (also see Novato meteorite). || 
|}

84301–84400 

|-id=339
| 84339 Francescaballi ||  || Francesca Balli (born 1969) fiancée of the discoverer Fabrizio Bernardi. She has been a lawyer since 1999 and is presently a civil and commercial mediator. || 
|-id=340
| 84340 Jos ||  || Jos Dianovich Claerbout (1974–1999), beloved son of Jon and Diane Claerbout, was an American writer, web engineer, film producer, and creator of magnificent hats. Src || 
|-id=342
| 84342 Rubensdeazevedo ||  || Rubens de Azevedo (1921–2008) was a Brazilian astronomer and science promoter. He founded observatories and associations, including the Brazilian Society of Astronomy Friends, the first amateur astronomical association in Brazil. He was a selenographer and active participant in NASA's Lunar International Observers Network. || 
|}

84401–84500 

|-id=417
| 84417 Ritabo ||  || Rita Boles, wife of Scottish amateur astronomer and discoverer of this minor planet, Tom Boles || 
|-id=447
| 84447 Jeffkanipe ||  || Jeff Kanipe (born 1953), an American astronomical author and editor, who became interested in a spike extending out of the image of Arp 192  NGC 3303  while working on a publication for the fortieth anniversary of Arp's Atlas of Peculiar Galaxies. This led to its recognition in 2009 as a prediscovery trail of this minor planet on 19 February 1964. || 
|}

84501–84600 

|-id=566
| 84566 VIMS ||  || The Visible and Infrared Mapping Spectrometer (VIMS) on board the Cassini–Huygens spacecraft studied the Saturnian system for 13 years (2004–2017). It provided data to determine the composition, temperatures and structures of surfaces, rings and atmospheres. || 
|}

84601–84700 

|-bgcolor=#f2f2f2
| colspan=4 align=center | 
|}

84701–84800 

|-bgcolor=#f2f2f2
| colspan=4 align=center | 
|}

84801–84900 

|-id=882
| 84882 Table Mountain ||  || The site of the Table Mountain Observatory in California was developed by the Smithsonian Institution in 1924 to conduct studies of the solar constant. In 1958 the Jet Propulsion Laboratory began solar panel tests at this site, now a NASA facility where atmospheric study groups and optical astronomy conduct daily science year round. || 
|-id=884
| 84884 Dorismcmillan ||  || Doris McMillan (1909–1999) of San Benito, Texas, was a science educator with Cranbrook Institute of Science in Bloomfield Hills, Michigan, in the 1960s and influential to many amateur and professional astronomers, space scientists and educators. || 
|}

84901–85000 

|-id=902
| 84902 Porrentruy ||  || The village of Porrentruy in Switzerland || 
|-id=919
| 84919 Karinthy || 2003 VH || Frigyes Karinthy (1887–1938) was a Hungarian author, playwright, poet, journalist and translator. His sense of humor and criticism already appeared in his early diaries. He started his writing career as a journalist and remained a writer of short, humorous blurbs until his death. He is one of the most popular Hungarian writers || 
|-id=921
| 84921 Morkoláb ||  || The Morkoláb (or Markolaáb), Hungarian mythical animal that eats the Sun or Moon during an eclipse; this object was discovered during a total lunar eclipse || 
|-id=926
| 84926 Marywalker ||  || Mary Walker (born 1960), the Instrument Systems Manager for the OSIRIS-REx Mission. || 
|-id=928
| 84928 Oliversacks ||  || Oliver Sacks (1933–2015), a British neurologist and author. His descriptions of people confronting neurological challenges such as Parkinson's disease and Alzheimer's, together with his books about the brain, botany, chemistry and music, have inspired generations of doctors, patients and readers around the world. || 
|-id=943
| 84943 Timothylinn ||  || Timothy Linn (born 1970), the Systems Engineering Manager for the OSIRIS-REx Asteroid Sample Return Mission. || 
|-id=945
| 84945 Solosky ||  || Phil Solosky (born 1945) and Sueko Solosky (born 1950) Solosky were active members of the Sunset Astronomical Society in Michigan in the 1970s. || 
|-id=951
| 84951 Kenwilson ||  || Kenneth Dale Wilson (born 1954) is the former planetarium director with the Virginia Museum of Natural Sciences and a co-author of several books on amateur astronomy || 
|-id=991
| 84991 Bettyphilpotts ||  || Betty Philpotts Wilson (born 1958) is a board member of the Richmond Astronomical Society and was their first female President. || 
|-id=994
| 84994 Amysimon ||  || Amy Simon (born 1971), the Deputy Instrument Scientist for the OVIRS instrument on OSIRIS-REx || 
|-id=995
| 84995 Zselic ||  || Zselic, one of Hungary's most beautiful wooded regions. A Starry Sky Park is being set up in the area. || 
|-id=996
| 84996 Hortobágy ||  || Hortobágy National Park, an 800-square-km national park in eastern Hungary. || 
|}

References 

084001-085000